Kotigobba is a 2001 Indian Kannada-language action film starring Vishnuvardhan, Priyanka Upendra and Ashish Vidyarthi. The film was a remake of Rajinikanth's 1995 Tamil film Baashha. This movie was directed by Naganna and features soundtrack from Deva who also composed the music for the Tamil version.

A spiritual successor, Kotigobba 2, starring Sudeep and directed by K. S. Ravikumar was released in 2016.

Cast

Soundtrack

All the songs are composed and scored by Deva. The song "Annayya Thammayya" is a direct reused song of composer's own "Athaanda Ithaanda" from the Tamil film Arunachalam. The album has six soundtracks and an instrumental number. The songs "Sahasa Simha" and "Are Tai Tandana" were retained from the original Tamil film also composed by Deva.

Release 
The film met with very good reviews and was declared as one of the biggest blockbusters completing a successful 30 weeks at the box office and the success function was held at Chowdaiah Memorial Hall in Bengaluru on Saturday, 16 March 2002. In 2012, director Suresh Krissna who made the original version announced that he would be making a sequel to this film in Kannada language. Vishnuvardhan was nominated for Filmfare Best Actor category.

References

External links 
 

2001 films
2000s Kannada-language films
Indian action films
Kannada remakes of Tamil films
Films scored by Deva (composer)
Films directed by Naganna
2001 action films